Keith Hague (born 25 May 1946) is an English former professional footballer who played as a defender in the Football League for York City and in non-League football for Goole Town.

References

1946 births
Living people
Footballers from Kingston upon Hull
English footballers
Association football defenders
Goole Town F.C. players
York City F.C. players
English Football League players